was a Japanese ski jumper. He competed in the 1932 and 1936 Winter Olympics.

References

1913 births
1999 deaths
Ski jumpers at the 1932 Winter Olympics
Ski jumpers at the 1936 Winter Olympics
Japanese male ski jumpers
Olympic ski jumpers of Japan
Sportspeople from Hokkaido